Eason Chan Yick Shun (born 27 July 1974) is a Hong Kong singer and actor. Chan was ranked sixth in the 2013 Forbes China Celebrity Top 100 List.

In 2006 Chan's Cantonese album U87 was named one of Time magazine's "Five Asian Albums Worth Buying". Chan has won a number of Golden Melody Awards. In 2003, he won Best Mandarin Male Singer and Best Mandarin Album for Special Thanks To.... In 2009, he won Best Mandarin Album for Don't Want to Let Go. Chan won his second Best Mandarin Male Singer award in 2015, for the album Rice and Shine. In 2014, Chan's net worth was HK$100 million. In 2018, Chan was named Best Mandarin Male Singer for the third time – the most of any singer (tied with Johnny Yin) – for the album C'mon In~.

Chan was the most-streamed artist in Hong Kong on the Spotify music streaming platform from 2016 to 2020.

Early life
Chan was born in Hong Kong on 27 July 1974. Chan went to England to study when he was 12. He attended St. Joseph's kindergarten and St. Joseph's College Primary School in Hong Kong, Dauntsey's School in Wiltshire, England and later Kingston University, studying architecture. He also trained in vocals at the Royal Academy of Music, where he received Grade-8 vocal certifications. Chan returned to Hong Kong before the completion of his degree to participate in the 1995 New Talent Singing Awards Competition, winning first place. Hong Kong-based record label Capital Artists signed a contract with him, ending his future career as an architect while launching a career in music.

Career

Chan has won a number of Asian music awards. He is the second non-Taiwanese singer, after Jacky Cheung, to win Taiwan's Golden Melody Awards. He won "Best Male Singer" third, in 2003, 2015 and 2018, and "Best Album" twice. In 2003, 2009 and 2018. He also won Most Popular Male Singer in the Jade Solid Gold Best Ten Music Awards Presentation twice, in 2006 and 2007. He also won his first Asia Pacific's Most Popular Singer Award in 2007, and again in 2008. His album U87, named after his favourite microphone and released in 2005, was labeled by Time magazine as one of the five best Asian albums. U87 was the top selling non-concert, non-collection category album in Hong Kong in 2005. He was Hong Kong's highest selling male artist in 2002, 2003 and 2007. He has been one of Hong Kong's top selling artists every year since 2000. His concert DVD Get a Life was the highest selling album of 2006.

Chan has been praised by critics and fellow musicians alike as one of the top singers of his generation. Since the very beginning of his career, he has been one of the favourites to lead the new generation of Cantopop. He has been described as a breath of fresh air in the HK music scene. Over the last ten years, Chan has emerged as the leading male singer of his generation, fulfilling his role as an innovator and a leader in the HK music scene, winning prestigious awards one after another. Chan has also been successful in his work in the Mandopop scene. He has won numerous awards in both mainland China and Taiwan, most notably Taiwan's Golden Melody Awards. His album Admit It was nominated for Golden Melody Awards' Best Male Singer; although it was ultimately won by Gary Chaw. Next year, he was again nominated for Golden Melody Awards' Best Male Singer, for his work in Mandarin album "Don't Want To Let Go", although the award went to Jay Chou. However, Chan won Album of The Year for "Don't Want To Let Go".

Chan has been named by Chinese critics as the next God of Songs (歌神) after Jacky Cheung. However, Eason has more than once clarified that he wishes to build his own name instead, and not just be the successor of Jacky Cheung.  Chan and Cheung have sung a duet together, titled 天下太平, on the album Perfect Match by Albert Leung and Ronald Ng (伍樂城), released in April 2006. Chan and Cheung have collaborated on other occasions as well. They sang a duet of Cheung's, 頭髮亂了, in a fundraising campaign for SARS victims in 2003.

Chan plays several instruments in his live concerts, including the piano, the guitar, the harmonica, and the accordion.  Chan is also a songwriter.

In 2009, Chan performed in "PAX Musica 2009" in Tokyo. He sang seven songs, including a Japanese song by Koji Tamaki called "Mr. Lonely". This was his first time performing in Japan publicly.  Japanese Musician Ikuro Fujiwara  praised Chan for his charisma on stage and expressed hope to collaborate with Chan in the future. Chan planned to promote his musical works in Japan in 2010.

In 2011, Chan released a new album titled "Stranger Under My Skin" on 22 February. Released in November, Chan's latest album titled "?" features a piano performance by his seven-year-old daughter.

In 2012, Chan released the 《...3mm》Cantonese album on 10 August 2012. Followed by a remix version of the album, titled 《...3mm Remix》releasing on 8 November 2012. It is an album by Eric Kwok and Jerald Chan in composing music, including the number one songs "Finish" (<<完>>) and "Heavy taste" (<<重口味>>). At the same time, Chan opened his own music production company, EAS Music.

In 2014, he received Honorary Doctor of Arts degree for accomplishments in the Cantonese music industry from Kingston University, where he studied architecture before entering the entertainment industry.

In 2015, Chan released the Cantonese album Preparing (準備中) which contain the number one song "Unconditional" (無條件). Chan received multiple awards for the work.

Concerts
Chan has held five major theme concerts at the famous Hong Kong Coliseum starting from 1999. His first series of concerts at the Hong Kong Coliseum, a total of four Eason's 99Big Live concerts and came four years after his debut in 1995. Even today, that amount of time is considered short for a singer to gain the general approval and public support needed to perform at such a prestigious venue. Two years later in 2001, Chan held a series of nine The Easy Ride concerts at the Hong Kong Coliseum under the wing of his second record company, Music Plus. In 2003, he again held a series of seven The Third Encounter concerts with the support of Music Plus. In the spring of 2006, after a year of rest and another change of record company, Chan held his fourth theme concerts, a total of nine Get a Life concerts at the Hong Kong Coliseum. A year later, Chan broke his own record while holding his fifth series of concerts named Eason's Moving on Stage. During October and November 2007, he completed a total of 16 hugely successful Chan's Moving on Stage1 concerts at the Hong Kong Coliseum. As of January 2008, Chan has held 45 concerts at Hong Kong Coliseum.

Chan began his Moving on Stage World Tour in February 2008. He traveled to Taiwan, Canada, Australia, Guangzhou, Shanghai, Malaysia, Macau, Singapore, Kunming, Tianjin, Chongqing, Shenzhen, Los Angeles, San Francisco, Hangzhou, Guiyang, Beijing, and Foshan. Chan's Moving on Stage World Tour ended with Eason Chan's Moving on Stage 26 at Kuala Lumpur, Malaysia, on 16 August 2009.

Months after his Moving On Stage Concerts came to finish, Chan began another tour in mainland China, called "Ninety Minutes of Bliss". Instead of playing at grand venues, Chan played at smaller venues in order to get closer to his fans. He completed two concerts in Nanjing and three more in Shanghai before and during Christmas 2009. Two more concerts were held in Beijing on 29 and 30 May in 2010.

In between his tours, Chan held his sixth record-breaking Theme Concerts at the Hong Kong Coliseum for a total of 18 concerts, scheduled from 20 March to 6 April 2010. This new series is called Duo Eason Chan 2010 Concert (《DUO陳奕迅2010演唱會》).

After the May "Ninety Minutes of Bliss" concerts in Beijing, Chan went to Europe for his first European tour scheduled. He visited three cities over the course of 5 days: London, Manchester, and Rotterdam.  The venues for the three concerts were, respectively, Royal Albert Hall, Manchester Apollo and Rotterdam Ahoy. Tickets to his London and Manchester concerts were each sold out within hours of ticket release. Chan is the second Hong Kong singer after Roman Tam to perform in the prestigious Royal Albert Hall.

At Chan's concert in Beijing on 29 September 2011 at the Beijing Workers' Stadium, Faye Wong made a special guest appearance, surprising many as Wong had not previously accepted any invitations to appear as a special guest at another singer's concert; this was the first time that she did so.

Continuing his Duo Eason Chan 2010 Concert World Tour, Chan made his second appearance in London, the O2 Arena on 23 April 2012. He became the first Asian artist playing in the O2 stage. The concert was sold out in twenty minutes to 12,000 fans.

In 2015, Chan held his 100th show of Another Eason Life's World Tour in Montreal, Quebec, Canada, on 4 December 2015. This was the first time ever that a Hongkongese singer has performed at the Centre Bell. The tour ended late in 2016, as he took a break from concert touring.

In September 2017, Chan began a new tour called Eason Says C mon In~tour, which is noted for performing in small stadiums like Macpherson Stadium, Hong Kong, which only seats about 2500 people. The album's price was set at HK$750.

On 18 and 19 August 2005, Chan performed the musical Wrestling with God (人神鬥), the second programme of Love Music Tour 05 organised by Netvigator. He was the actor and producer. Stars featured in the show included famous comedian Jim Chim (詹瑞文), singer Wilfred Lau (劉浩龍), Taiwanese singer Mavis Fan (范曉萱), Best Supporting Actress Winner of the 23rd Hong Kong Film Awards Josie Ho (何超儀), pop duo at17 and Soler. The story was about the competition among different angels (played by the featured stars) to protect the only man alive in the world (played by Eason Chan). The secret guest, veteran singer George Lam (林子祥), played Chan's late father. The audience were impressed by the performers, who told the story through song and dance.

In 21 November 2019, Chan announced that "Fear and Dreams" Concerts would be cancelled because of unstable circumstances in Hong Kong.

Charity work
Chan has been appointed as Orbis International's Sight Ambassador in Hong Kong since 2006. He has travelled to India and Sichuan, China, visiting kids and elders with visual impairment, to raise funds for Orbis. Eason has also been an active participant in Hong Kong's fundraising campaigns such as the 2003 fundraiser for SARS victims and the 2008 fundraiser for Sichuan earthquake victims.

On 7 July 2007 Eason performed at the Chinese leg of 'Live Earth' in Shanghai.

In July 2020, Chan held the online charity concert, The Live Is So Much Better With Music Eason Chan Charity Concert, at the Hong Kong Coliseum in support of the Hong Kong Live Performance and Production Industry Association. Chan performed in an empty stadium due to the COVID-19 restrictions.

Personal life
In 2002, Chan suffered a severe groin injury when he fell off the stage during his concert in Taiwan. As a result, one of this testicles had to be surgically removed. He has since then fully recovered.

In 2006 he married former actress Hilary Tsui (徐濠縈) with whom he has a daughter, Constance, b. 2004. In 2012, there was rumour about their marriage is on the rocks due to Tsui's drug scandal. The couple had to hold a press conference to deny all rumours and allegations.

In 2013, Chan revealed he had suffered from bipolar disorder and phobia of large crowds during the 11th night of his "Life Concert 2013". In 2020,Chan has been appointed as the "Shall We Talk" initiative's ambassador to promote mental health and arouse public attention to mental well-being. His classic Canto-pop song, "Shall We Talk", has been chosen as the theme song.

Support for Xinjiang-sourced cotton
On 25 March 2021, Chan's company, My Kan Wonderland Limited announced on Weibo that the company would "resolutely boycott any behaviour vilifying China" and that the company would terminate its role as a brand ambassador for Adidas, leading to public backlash against Chan. The announcement came after Adidas and other members of the Better Cotton Initiative had publicly resolved to not use cotton sourced from Xinjiang and also following a BBC investigation that found that Uyghur forced labor was being used in the production of cotton in the region. The South China Morning Post reported that, after the announcement was made, Chan's Facebook page, which did not mention the boycott, was flooded with "thousands [of] comments sharply critical of the move" and that "[a]ccording to the United Nations, human rights groups and victim testimonials, China has placed at least 1 million Uygurs and other ethnic minorities in high security camps, where they are subjected to indoctrination, torture and forced labour." China maintains that claims of forced labor in Xinjiang are "entirely fabricated".

Awards and recognition

Since his debut, Chan has won awards including nine "Supreme Grand Prix du Disque"; six "Grand Songs Awards" for "K Song King" (2000), "Magnificent Sunset" (2005), "Seven Hundred Years Later" (2009), "Flavours" (2012), "The Wind Took" (2013) and "Unconditional" (2015); "Male Singer Gold" and "Best Male Singer". He has won a number of Top Ten Golden Melody awards, Male Singer of the Year awards and Album Of The Year awards.

In 1998, the songs "My Happy Times" and "Odyssey", gave a boost to Chan's career. In subsequent years, "God Bless Sweetheart", "Shall We Dance? Shall We Talk!" and songs brought Chan a number of awards. In 2004, Chan's career was troubled by contractual issues. When Chan changed to Cinepoly in 2005, songs such as "U87" and "Magnificent Sunset" brought further awards. In 2006 and 2007, the songs "Crazy", "Mount Fuji" and "Crying in the Party" were award-winning. In 2008, the song "The road has been in ..." increased Chan's audience and won awards. In 2009, the album "H3M" and the songs "Seven Hundred Years" and "Salon" were successful. Eason has been selected as the "King of Asian Pop Music" by Hong Kong's Time Out magazine since 2012. He has been one of China's best-selling artists since 2000 and has won many prestigious awards. His world tour includes performances at the Royal Albert Hall, and he is the first Chinese artist to perform at the O2 Arena in London. In 2013, the song The Wind Took won an award.

Discography

Studio albums

Songs 
Below is a list of songs that are composed, written, arranged or produced by Eason Chan.

Filmography

Eason Chan is a notable actor who has starred in multiple films. Chan made his debut in 1997 and has starred or co-starred in over 20 films. He was nominated for Best Supporting Actor by Hong Kong's Golden Film Awards in 2000 for his role in Lavender. In 2005, he was nominated for Best Actor by Hong Kong's Golden Bauhinia Awards for his work in Crazy N' The City. In 2008, he was nominated for Best Supporting Actor by Taiwan's Golden Horse Awards for his work in Trivial Matters. In 2010, Eason Chan participated in the romantic comedy film "Love in Space" with Aaron Kwok, Kwai Lun Mei and René Liu.
In 2011, Eason Chan participated in the film "Mr And Mrs Single" with Michelle Bai, they played a couple who met again after divorce, found themselves and remarried. He voiced Po in the Cantonese version of Kungfu Panda in 2015. He also starred in musical dramas "Office" with Chow Yun Fat, which was directed by Johnny To. In 2016, he played Ma Li in Zhang Jiajia's 2016 movie See You Tomorrow, a wasted rockstar who rediscovers his love for music after a heartbreak. He play a leader of one school in the movie "Our Shining Days" in 2017, but also produced the film's theme song.

References

External links

Official
 Eason Chan's Profile  at Universal Music
 イーソン・チャンオフィシャルブログ – Eason Chan's Official Blog in Japanese
 陈奕迅 新浪微博 Eason Chan's Weibo
 Eason Chan's Official Facebook Page
Others

New Talent Singing Awards contestants
1974 births
Living people
20th-century Hong Kong male singers
20th-century Hong Kong male actors
21st-century Hong Kong male singers
21st-century Hong Kong male actors
Alumni of Kingston University
Cantopop singers
Hong Kong Mandopop singers
Hong Kong male film actors
Hong Kong male television actors
Hong Kong idols
People educated at Dauntsey's School
People with bipolar disorder